Gásadatjávri is a lake in Karasjok Municipality in Troms og Finnmark county, Norway.

See also
List of lakes in Norway

References

Karasjok
Lakes of Troms og Finnmark